St Martins' Hospital, Malindi, is a 100-bed missionary community hospital in the town of Malindi, Malawi.

Location
The hospital is located in Malindi, a town in Mangochi District, in the Southern Region of Malawi.

Overview
This hospital is under the jurisdiction of the Lakeshore Health Department of the  Diocese of Southern Malawi–Upper Shire, a component of the Church of the Province of Central Africa.

St Martin’s caters to a population of approximately 40,000 people in Malindi and neighboring settlements. In addition to the hospital facilities, a mobile medical unit is available to take services to needy, distant communities. 

The hospital has the following departments  
 Maternity Ward
 Pediatric Ward
 Male Ward
 Female Ward
 Outpatient Department
 Operating Theatre (out of action).

History
The hospital was founded in 1898, as a clinic, staffed by one nurse, who cared for sick missionaries and their families. Over the next five years the hospital expanded enough so that it could accommodate 305 patients per month.

By 2014, the bed capacity had increased to 50 and although there was no doctor, there were five capable clinical officers and a team of nurses and patient assistants, who kept the hospital in motion. The hospital runs a daily antiretroviral clinic, as well as regular antenatal, family planning, and vaccination clinics. The operating room is used for caesarean sections, female sterilizations, hernia repairs, and incision and drainage operations.

As of November 2018, the hospital had grown to 100 in-patient beds. There is currently no doctor at this hospital and it is instead run by the two Clinical Officers Mr Peter Moffat and Mr Harvey Likapa.

See also
 List of hospitals in Malawi

References

External links
Website of St Martins Hospital Malindi, Malawi

Hospitals in Malawi
Hospitals established in 1898
1898 establishments in the British Central Africa Protectorate
Mangochi District
Southern Region, Malawi